The Pickle is a 1993 film produced, written, and directed by Paul Mazursky, telling the story of a formerly powerful film director whose recent string of flops has forced him to make a commercial piece that is artistically uninspired. The absurdity of the film within the film satirizes big-budget Hollywood pictures, while the rest of the story serves as a character study of fictitious film director Harry Stone.

Plot
Danny Aiello stars as Harry Stone, an NYC film director who has been living in Paris, France for the past ten years. Despite the fact that he still has a loyal fan base, his last three films were flops, and he returns to New York to hear a pitch from a studio executive. The movie turns out to be The Pickle, a science fiction film with an absurd storyline, but when the executive offers him "a ton of money," Harry immediately sells out his better judgment and agrees to direct the picture.

Aside from a few flashbacks to Harry's childhood, and to the events leading up to the making of The Pickle, most of the story takes place on the day of the new film's premiere. Harry is reunited with his agent, publicist, son, daughter, mother, and ex-wives (both of whom are still on good terms with Harry), and the movie explores these relationships in various combinations; Harry's Parisian girlfriend also plays a major role. Despite Harry's stress about the upcoming premiere—he regrets selling out to make The Pickle, and fears that it will ruin his career—the director spends time to enjoy the people in his life.

Harry's Career
Dialogue establishes several details about Harry's career:  His biggest success was a Western called Blue Sands; his most recent film, Paradise Jack, was a hit with his fans, but trashed by the critics and a disappointment at the box office. Harry had ambitions to make cinematic adaptations of Anna Karenina and Huckleberry Finn, but funding fell through after the box office disappointment of Paradise Jack. His dream project is to direct an epic about Cortez and Montezuma starring Dustin Hoffman (despite his admission that Hoffman is too old for either role), but he angrily balks when a studio executive suggests updating the story to a present-day L.A. barrio. The success of The Pickle leads the executive to greenlight the Cortez/Montezuma film, but Harry instead pitches a drama with a storyline loosely mirroring the events of his own return to New York.

The Movie Within the Movie
The movie featured within the movie—also called The Pickle—involves a group of farmers who grow a pickle to gigantic proportions and convert it into a spaceship, which they fly into outer space. They land on a planet nearly identical to Earth, where one of the farmers (played by Ally Sheedy) develops a romance with an advisor to the President of the United States. (The President is played by Little Richard as himself, and performs an impromptu rendition of "Good Golly, Miss Molly".)  The romance is ended when Sheedy decides that, as a vegetarian, she cannot live on a planet where all food is made out of flies.

Cast

Critical reception
On review aggregator website Rotten Tomatoes The Pickle holds an approval rating of 20% based on 5 reviews, with an average rating of 4.4/10.

Janet Maslin of The New York Times:

Roger Ebert of the Chicago Sun-Times gave the film 2 stars out of 4 on his rating scale:

The film was a box-office failure, and Mazursky never directed a film based on his own screenplay again.

References

External links

Official trailer

1993 films
American comedy-drama films
Columbia Pictures films
Films scored by Michel Legrand
Films about film directors and producers
Films set in New York City
Films shot in New York City
Films directed by Paul Mazursky
1990s English-language films
1990s American films
Films about the film industry